The 2006 Women's Holland Handball Tournament was held in Rotterdam at the Topsportcentrum Rotterdam. The tournament started on 2 November 2006 and the final match was played on 5 November. Brazil already secured their win in the tournament with still one more match to be played. They also won their last match versus the hosts and won all of their five matches scoring a total of 163 goals and conceding only 123.

Results

November 1, 2006

November 2, 2006

November 3, 2006

November 4, 2006

November 5, 2006

External links
Official website

Women's Holland Handball Tournament
Handball competitions in Europe
Women's handball in the Netherlands
Women's Holland Handball Tournament
Holland Handball Tournament